A mime or mime artist is a person who uses a theatrical medium or performance art involving the acting out of a story through body motions without use of speech called miming.

Mime or miming may also refer to:

Arts and entertainment

Performance
 Lip sync, an alternative word for lip sync
 Mimicry or imitation
 Mime, a style of Dorian Greek poetry also called mime-iambic; see Sophron
 Miming in instrumental performance

Fictional characters
 Mime, a character in Richard Wagner's Der Ring des Nibelungen corresponding to Regin in Old Norse texts
 Mime, a fictional character in the cartoon series Happy Tree Friends
 Mr. Mime and Mime Jr., species of Pokémon

Other uses
 MIME, Multipurpose Internet Mail Extensions
S/MIME
8BITMIME
 MIME type, the original application of media type, a computer feature for the identification of file formats on the internet 
 Mime Glacier, a small glacier in Antarctica
 Mimecast (Nasdaq: MIME)
 A unit of imitation in the theory of symbiosism

See also
 
 Meme (disambiguation)
 Mim (disambiguation)
 Mímir or Mim is a figure in Norse mythology
 Mimo (disambiguation)
 Mine (disambiguation)
 MyM, a U.K. magazine
 Mymensingh, Bangladesh